Kia Mahalleh (also Romanized as Kīā Maḥalleh) is a village in Bala Taleqan Rural District, in the Central District of Taleqan County, Alborz Province, Iran. At the 2006 census, its population was 31, in 5 families.

References 

Populated places in Taleqan County